Group D of UEFA Women's Euro 2017 contained England, Portugal, Scotland and Spain. The matches were played from 19 to 27 July 2017.

Teams

Standings

In the quarter-finals:
The winners of Group D, England, advance to play the runners-up of Group C, France.
The runners-up of Group D, Spain, advance to play the winners of Group C, Austria.

Matches
All times are local (UTC+2).

Spain vs Portugal

England vs Scotland

Scotland vs Portugal

England vs Spain

Portugal vs England

Scotland vs Spain

References

External links
Official website

Group D
England–Scotland football rivalry